Evelyn Stolze (born 8 January 1954) is a former East German swimmer. She competed at the 1972 Summer Olympics in the 200 m and 400 m  individual medley events and finished in sixth and fifth place, respectively. She won three medals in medley and butterfly events at the 1970 European Aquatics Championships.

She married Peter Rund, an East German water polo player and swimmer. Their daughter Cathleen (born 1977) also became an Olympic swimmer.

References

1954 births
Sportspeople from Erfurt
Living people
East German female swimmers
East German female butterfly swimmers
East German female medley swimmers
Olympic swimmers of East Germany
Swimmers at the 1972 Summer Olympics
European Aquatics Championships medalists in swimming